Thanawat Thirapongpaiboon ( Ṭhnwạtʹhn̒ T̄hirphngṣ̄̒phịbūly̒; born December 14, 1993) is a Thai former professional snooker player. He turned professional in 2010 as the Asian nomination following his run to the semi-finals of the 2010 Asian Championship. At the age of 17, he was the youngest player competing on the 2010/2011 main tour.

He is also the youngest snooker player to have made an official maximum break in professional competition; he achieved this at the 2010 Rhein–Main Masters aged 16 years and 312 days.

Following an investigation by the sport's governing body, Thirapongpaiboon admitted fixing the outcome of six professional matches between 2013 and 2015. He was suspended unconditionally from 15 June 2022 until 14 March 2025, after which his return to the sport will be conditional on continued assistance with the governing body's anti-corruption work.

Career

2010/2011 season
In his very first professional tournament, the Shanghai Masters Thirapongpaiboon made an impact by beating Justin Astley 5–3, Mark Joyce 5–4 and Nigel Bond 5–1 before losing 4–5 to Mark Davis, just one frame away from reaching the final stages in Shanghai.

Thirapongpaiboon made the 74th official maximum break during his third round match against Barry Hawkins at Euro Players Tour Championship 2010/2011 – Event 3, but lost the match 1–4. With this he became the youngest player ever to make an official maximum break at the age of 16 years and 312 days. Nevertheless, he fell off the tour after one year. In July 2011 he won the IBSF World Under-21 Snooker Championship by defeating Noppon Saengkham 9–3 in the final and in doing so earned a place back on the main snooker tour for the 2012–13 season.

2012/2013 season
Thirapongpaiboon came through three qualifying matches, before losing in the final round in both the Australian Goldfields Open and the Shanghai Masters, losing to Liang Wenbo and in a last frame decide to Jamie Cope respectively. This was the closest he came to reaching the main of a ranking event. He had a very good season in the minor-ranking Players Tour Championship events, reaching the quarter-finals in the fifth and sixth European Tour events. In the fifth event he beat compatriot Thepchaiya Un-Nooh, Liu Chuang and top 16 player Barry Hawkins, before losing 3–4 to Anthony McGill, and in the sixth event he beat the likes of Fergal O'Brien, Ricky Walden and Liang Wenbo, before being whitewashed 0–4 by Mark Selby. He also reached the last 16 of another event to finish 38th on the PTC Order of Merit. Thirapongpaiboon defeated Jamie O'Neill 10–8 and Mike Dunn 10–6 in World Championship Qualifying, but his season was ended in the next round when he lost 8–10 to Matthew Selt. He finished the year ranked world number 71.

2013/2014 season
After Thirapongpaiboon's 5–0 loss to Ross Muir in the first round of Shanghai Masters qualifiers it was announced by World Snooker that the match was being investigated due to unusual betting patterns. However, the governing body concluded the case in January 2014 finding no link between the player and suspicious betting activity. The only ranking event Thirapongpaiboon qualified for this season was the Indian Open where he beat Lü Haotian 4–1, before losing 4–2 to Stuart Bingham in the second round. Thirapongpaiboon was relegated from the tour at the end of the season as he was ranked world number 87, outside of the top 64 who remain.

In June 2014, he won the ACBS Asian Under-21 Snooker Championship by defeating Siyavosh Mozayani 6–1 in the final and earned a two-year tour card for the 2014–15 and 2015–16 seasons.

2014/2015 season
Thirapongpaiboon did not play his first match of the season until the opening round of the UK Championship, where he was thrashed 6–0 by Stuart Bingham. His first win of the year came courtesy of a 4–0 whitewash over Jimmy Robertson to qualify for the Indian Open, where he lost 4–1 to compatriot Dechawat Poomjaeng in the first round. Thirapongpaiboon's limited season ended with a 10–6 loss to Robertson in the second round of World Championship qualifying after he had seen off Kyren Wilson 10–3 in the first.

2015/2016 season
Thirapongpaiboon once again played a select few events during the 2015–16 season and could only win two matches, which came at the Haining Open. He has not played on the main snooker tour since December 2015 and was relegated from it at the end of the season.

2022/2023 season
Tirapongpaiboon took part in the inaugural edition of the Q School Asia & Oceania event after the conclusion of the 2021-22 snooker season. He entered in Event 1 and reached the semi-finals, where he beat fellow Thai Dechawat Poomjaeng. Despite having been eligible to receive a two-year tour card for doing so, on 22 June 2022, the WPBSA and World Snooker Tour declined to offer him a tour card, citing "serious disciplinary matters from when Thanawat was previously a professional player in 2015" as the reason. On 1 September, 2022 the WPBSA announced they were charging him with fixing the outcome of 6 World Snooker Tour matches between 2013 and 2015.

Performance and rankings timeline

Career finals

Amateur finals: 4 (2 titles)

References

External links 

 
Thanawat Thirapongpaiboon at worldsnooker.com

Thanawat Thirapongpaiboon
Living people
1993 births
Thanawat Thirapongpaiboon
Southeast Asian Games medalists in cue sports
Competitors at the 2011 Southeast Asian Games